Monocular O (Capital: ,) is one of the rare glyph variants of Cyrillic letter . This glyph variant was used in certain manuscripts in the root word  (eye), and also in some other functions, for example, in the word- and syllable-initial position. It is used in some late birchbark letters of the 14th and 15th centuries, where it is usually differentiated from a regular , used after consonants, also by width, being a broad On (ѻ) with a dot inside.

It resembles the Latin letter for the bilabial click (ʘ), and the Gothic letter Hwair. It was proposed for inclusion into Unicode in 2007 alongside the Binocular O, Double monocular O, and Multiocular O, and was incorporated as characters U+A668 (majuscule) and U+A669 (minuscule) in Unicode version 5.1 (2008).

See also
 Broad On
 Omega (Cyrillic)
 ʘ : Latin letter ʘ
 𐍈 : Gothic letter Hwair
 Dotted zero

References

Eyes in culture